Curvy Brides is an American reality television series which aired on TLC. The show is centered around Curvaceous Couture Bridal, a family-owned bridal salon catering to plus-size women in Columbia, Maryland. Episodes feature sisters and Curvaceous Couture co-owners Yukia Walker and Yuneisia Harris helping brides find the dress of their dreams for their wedding day.

Curvy Brides resembles the rest of TLC's wedding-themed programming, like the popular Say Yes to the Dress, but focuses brides sized 12-44 that have more trouble finding dresses that fit and flatter their bodies. Brides profiled on the show often cannot find gowns in their size in traditional stores, and discuss being treated rudely and discouraged from shopping at other bridal salons.

Episodes

References

External links

2014 American television series debuts
2010s American reality television series
TLC (TV network) original programming
Wedding television shows
2015 American television series endings